The United States Sentencing Commission is an independent agency of the judicial branch of the U.S. federal government. It is responsible for articulating the U.S. Federal Sentencing Guidelines for the federal courts. The Commission promulgates the Federal Sentencing Guidelines, which replaced the prior system of indeterminate sentencing that allowed trial judges to give sentences ranging from probation to the maximum statutory punishment for the offense. It is headquartered in Washington, D.C.

The commission was created by the Sentencing Reform Act provisions of the Comprehensive Crime Control Act of 1984. The constitutionality of the commission was challenged as a congressional encroachment on the power of the executive but upheld by the Supreme Court in Mistretta v. United States, .

The U.S. Sentencing Commission was established by Congress as a permanent, independent agency within the judicial branch. The seven members of the Commission are appointed by the President and confirmed by the Senate, for a term of six years. The Judicial Conference offers names of potential nominees to the President for nomination. Commission members may be reappointed to one additional term, also with the advice and consent of the Senate.  Some Commission members have been appointed to finish out the term of prior members instead of starting their own 6-year term, and therefore, not all Commission members have served six years or more. Three of the members must be federal judges, and no more than four may belong to the same political party. The Attorney General or his designee and the chair of the United States Parole Commission sit as ex officio, non-voting members of the Commission. The Commission requires a quorum of at least four voting members in order to promulgate amendments to the Sentencing Guidelines.

The Commission lacked full membership from 2014 to 2022. On August 4, 2022, the Senate confirmed President Biden's seven nominees to the Commission; all the confirmed members were sworn in the next day.

Current membership
:

Former membership
As listed on the U.S. Sentencing Commission's website:

"Drugs Minus Two Amendment" 
On April 10, 2014, the Commission unanimously voted to approve the "Drugs Minus Two Amendment." The "Drugs Minus Two Amendment" changed the U.S. Federal Sentencing Guidelines to "reduce the applicable sentencing guideline range for most federal drug trafficking offenses." The Commission voted to make the Amendment retroactive on July 18, 2014, "thereby allowing eligible offenders serving a previously imposed term of imprisonment to file a motion under 18 U.S.C. § 3582(c)(2) for a sentence reduction."

2015 actions
After a visit to a federal prison in Oklahoma by President Barack Obama in July 2015, the Commission issued new retroactive sentencing guidelines in October which lowered sentences for many drug offenders. The sentencing panel estimated that roughly 46,000 of 100,000 drug offenders serving federal sentences would qualify for early release. 6,000 would be released in November but 1/3 of those inmates were to be turned over to I.C.E. for deportation proceedings. The commission's change represents an overall change in prosecution of drug-related offences. In response to the change, senators, in a bipartisan effort, are attempting to reduce minimum sentences for these offenses.

Judicial Conference of the United States Commissioner Candidate Suggestions 
In April 2021, the Judicial Conference of the United States sent the following candidate suggestions to President Biden: Judge Luis Felipe Restrepo (to represent a Democrat seat), Judge Denise Jefferson Casper (Democrat seat), Judge Abdul Kallon (Democrat seat), Judge Carol Bagley Amon (Republican seat), Judge Federico Moreno (Republican seat), and Judge Michael Seabright (Republican seat).

Past Presidential Commissioner Nominations

President Barack Obama Nominees 
On April 20, 2009, President Barack Obama nominated William K. Sessions III, of Vermont, to be Chair of the Commission.

On July 23, 2009, President Barack Obama nominated Ketanji Brown Jackson to be a Commissioner.

On April 28, 2010, President Barack Obama nominated Judge Patti B. Saris as Commissioner and Chair, and nominated Dabney Langhorne Friedrich as a Commissioner (for a second term).

In April 2012, President Barack Obama nominated Senior District Judge Charles R. Breyer of the United States District Court for the Northern District of California as a Commissioner.

In April 2013, President Barack Obama nominated Rachel Elise Barkow, of New York, to be a Member of the United States Sentencing Commission; Charles R. Breyer, of California, to be a Member of the United States Sentencing Commission; and William H. Pryor Jr., of Alabama, to be a Member of the United States Sentencing Commission.

On September 9, 2015, President Barack Obama nominated Judge Richard F. Boulware and Judge Charles R. Breyer as Commissioners.

On March 15, 2016, President Barack Obama nominated Judge Danny C. Reeves as a Commissioner.

On January 17, 2017, President Barack Obama nominated Charles R. Breyer for reappointment and Danny C. Reeves as a Commissioner.

President Donald Trump Nominees 
In March of 2018, President Donald Trump said he intended to nominate four candidates to the Commission: "Judge William Pryor of Alabama, Judge Luis Felipe Restrepo of Pennsylvania, Judge Henry Hudson of Virginia and Georgetown University law professor William Graham Otis."

On August 12, 2020, President Donald Trump nominated five individuals to join the Sentencing Commission: Judge K. Michael Moore, of Florida, as Chairman of the United States Sentencing Commission; Judge Claria Horn Boom, of Kentucky, as a Commissioner of the United States Sentencing Commission; Judge Henry E. Hudson, of Virginia, as a Commissioner of the United States Sentencing Commission; John G. Malcolm (Vice President for the Institute for Constitutional Government and the Director of the Meese Center for Legal & Judicial Studies at the Heritage Foundation), as a Commissioner of the United States Sentencing Commission; and Judge Luis Felipe Restrepo, of Pennsylvania, as a Commissioner of the United States Sentencing Commission. In a blog post, Professor Douglas A. Berman questioned whether it was feasible for all five individuals to be confirmed, as the Commission can have no more than four members from any one political party, there was already one Republican member on the Commission at the time, and all five nominees appeared to be Republicans.

See also 
 Sentencing Act of 1987

References

External links
United States Sentencing Commission
United States Sentencing Commission in the Federal Register
Interviews with first four Commission Chairs
From the Hill to the Court to the Commission (Interview with Commission Chair Patti Saris, The Third Branch Sept. 2011)
Significant Dates and Decisions in the History of the Sentencing Guidelines
Anonymous hacks US Sentencing Commission, distributes files
Records of the United States Sentencing Commission in the National Archives (Record Group 539)

Sentencing Commission
Sentencing commissions in the United States
1984 establishments in the United States